The 2006–07 season of the División de Honor de Futsal is the 18th season of top-tier futsal in Spain.

Regular season

League table

Playoffs

Championship playoffs

The Finals were broadcast in Spain on RTVE.

Championship playoffs matches

Quarter-finals
(1) Boomerang Interviú vs. (8) Carnicer Torrejón:
Game 1 23 May @ Alcalá de Henares: Boomerang Interviú 8-4 Carnicer Torrejón
Game 2 26 May @ Torrejón de Ardoz: Carnicer Torrejón 2-4 Boomerang Interviú
Boomerang Interviú wins the series 2-0
Total Aggregate: 12-6

(2) Polaris World Cartagena vs. (7) PSG Móstoles:
Game 1 23 May @ Cartagena: Polaris World Cartagena 3-0 PSG Móstoles
Game 2 26 May @ Móstoles: PSG Móstoles 3-4 Polaris World Cartagena
Polaris World Cartagena wins the series 2-0
Total Aggregate: 7-3

(3) ElPozo Murcia Turística vs. (6) Caja Segovia:
Game 1 23 May @ Murcia: ElPozo Murcia Turística 4-4 Caja Segovia // Pen: 5-4
Game 2 26 May @ Segovia: Caja Segovia 4-3 ElPozo Murcia Turística
Game 3 2 June @ Murcia: ElPozo Murcia Turística 2-1 Caja Segovia
ElPozo Murcia Turística wins the series 2-1
Total Aggregate: 9-9

(4) Benicarló Onda Urbana vs. (5) MRA Navarra:
Game 1 23 May @ Benicarló: Benicarló Onda Urbana 2-2 MRA Navarra // Pen: 3-4
Game 2 26 May @ Pamplona: MRA Navarra 3-4 Benicarló Onda Urbana
Game 3 2 June @ Benicarló: Benicarló Onda Urbana 7-0 MRA Navarra
Benicarló Onda Urbana wins the series 2-1
Total Aggregate: 13-5

Semifinals
(1) Boomerang Interviú vs. (4) Benicarló Onda Urbana
Game 1 7 May @ Alcalá de Henares: Boomerang Interviú 5-1 Benicarló Onda Urbana
Game 2 10 May @ Benicarló: Benicarló Onda Urbana 3-4 Boomerang Interviú
Boomerang Interviú wins the series 2-0
Total Aggregate: 9-4

(2) Polaris World Cartagena vs. (3) ElPozo Murcia Turística
Game 1 7 May @ Cartagena: Polaris World Cartagena 3-3 ElPozo Murcia Turística // Pen: 5-6
Game 2 10 May @ Murcia: ElPozo Murcia Turística 4-3 Polaris World Cartagena
ElPozo Murcia Turística wins the series 2-0
Total Aggregate: 6-7

Final
(1) Boomerang Interviú vs. (3) ElPozo Murcia Turística:
Game 1 @ Alcalá de Henares: Boomerang Interviú 7-8 ElPozo Murcia Turística
Game 2 @ Murcia: ElPozo Murcia Turística 3-2 Boomerang Interviú
ElPozo Murcia Turística wins the series 2-0
Total Aggregate: 9-11
CHAMPION: : ElPozo Murcia Turística

Relegation playoff

 Gestesa Guadalajara remained in División de Honor.

External links
2006–07 season at lnfs.es

See also
División de Honor de Futsal
Futsal in Spain

2006 07
futsal
2006–07 in Spanish futsal
Spain